Nck-associated protein 1 is a protein that in humans is encoded by the NCKAP1 gene.

Interactions 

NCKAP1 has been shown to interact with RAC1 and ABI1.

References

Further reading 

 
 
 
 
 
 
 
 
 
 
 
 

Human proteins